Court districts in Sweden divide Norrland which was never divided into hundreds and instead the court districts, or tingslag, served as the basic division of these rural areas.

Tingslag
Lits Court District in Jämtland
Hede Court District in Härjedalen
Umeå Court District in Västerbotten

Subdivisions of Sweden